Nina Kolarič (born 12 December 1986 in Ptuj) is a Slovenian athlete who specialises in the long jump. She holds both the indoor and outdoor national records with jumps of 6.67 and 6.78 metres respectively.

Kolarič represented Slovenia at the 2008 Summer Olympics where she finished in 26th place in the long jump.

Achievements

References 

 

1986 births
Living people
People from Ptuj
Slovenian female long jumpers
Olympic athletes of Slovenia
Athletes (track and field) at the 2008 Summer Olympics
Mediterranean Games silver medalists for Slovenia
Mediterranean Games bronze medalists for Slovenia
Mediterranean Games medalists in athletics
Athletes (track and field) at the 2009 Mediterranean Games
Athletes (track and field) at the 2013 Mediterranean Games
Competitors at the 2007 Summer Universiade